Balbach may refer to:

 Balbach Smelting & Refining Company, a former metal smelting plant in Newark, New Jersey, US
 Oberbalbach ("Upper Balbach"), a district in Lauda-Königshofen, Baden-Württemberg, Germany
 Unterbalbach ("Lower Balbach"), a district in Lauda-Königshofen, Baden-Württemberg, Germany

People with the surname
Edward Balbach, Jr. (1839–1910), president of Balbach Smelting & Refining Company and inventor of the metallurgical "Balbach Process"
John Balbach (1820–1896), pioneering settler and prominent citizen of San Jose, California
Louis Balbach (1896–1943), American diver